Billy Mataitai (born 20 July 1983) in Tahiti is a footballer who plays as a midfielder. He currently plays for AS Manu-Ura in the Tahiti Division Fédérale and the Tahiti national football team.

References

1983 births
Living people
French Polynesian footballers
Tahiti international footballers
Association football midfielders
2004 OFC Nations Cup players